Sérgio Manuel Freitas Pedro (born 17 June 1969) is a retired Angolan-born, Portuguese football midfielder.

References

1969 births
Living people
Portuguese footballers
Vitória F.C. players
Rio Ave F.C. players
C.D. Montijo players
F.C. Maia players
S.C.U. Torreense players
C.D. Nacional players
Leça F.C. players
C.D. Santa Clara players
F.C. Marco players
C.D. Trofense players
Leixões S.C. players
Association football midfielders
Primeira Liga players